These are the official results of the Women's 400 metres event at the 1972 Summer Olympics in Munich. The competition was held on 2 & 7 of September.  The favorite coming into the Olympics was Monika Zehrt of East Germany who equaled the world record in the previous July.  The other world record holder was Marilyn Neufville of Jamaica, who was also favored to win, but was injured and unable to compete. This left the field open to challenge the world record holder for the top prize.

Heats
The top four runners in each heat (blue) and the next four fastest (pink), advanced to the quarterfinal round.

Heat 1

Heat 2

Heat 3

Heat 4

Heat 5

Heat 6

Heat 7

Quarterfinals

The top four runners in each heat advanced to the semifinal round.

Quarterfinal 1

Quarterfinal 2

Quarterfinal 3

Quarterfinal 4

Semifinals

Top four in each heat advanced to the final round.

Semifinal 1

Semifinal 2

Final

Key: OR = Olympic record; DNS = did not start; DNF = did not finish

References

External links
Official report

Women's 400 metres
400 metres at the Olympics
1972 in women's athletics
Women's events at the 1972 Summer Olympics